In mathematics, a Killing vector field (often called a Killing field), named after Wilhelm Killing, is a vector field on a Riemannian manifold (or pseudo-Riemannian manifold) that preserves the metric.  Killing fields are the infinitesimal generators of isometries; that is, flows generated by Killing fields are continuous isometries of the manifold. More simply, the flow generates a symmetry, in the sense that moving each point of an object the same distance in the direction of the Killing vector will not distort distances on the object.

Definition 

Specifically, a vector field X is a Killing field if the Lie derivative with respect to X of the metric g vanishes:

In terms of the Levi-Civita connection, this is

for all vectors Y and Z. In local coordinates, this amounts to the Killing equation

This condition is expressed in covariant form. Therefore, it is sufficient to establish it in a preferred coordinate system in order to have it hold in all coordinate systems.

Examples

Killing field on the circle

The vector field on a circle that points clockwise and has the same length at each point is a Killing vector field, since moving each point on the circle along this vector field simply rotates the circle.

Killing fields in flat space
Here we derive the Killing fields for general flat space.
From Killing's equation and the Ricci identity for a covector ,

(using abstract index notation) where  is the Riemann curvature tensor, the following identity may be proven for a Killing field :

When the base manifold  is flat space, that is, Euclidean space or pseudo-Euclidean space (as for Minkowski space), we can choose global flat coordinates such that in these coordinates, the Levi-Civita connection and hence Riemann curvature vanishes everywhere, giving

where  is antisymmetric.

These generate pseudo-rotations (rotations and boosts) and translations respectively. Intuitively these preserve the (pseudo)-metric at each point.

For (pseudo-)Euclidean space of total dimension, in total there are  generators, making flat space maximally symmetric. This number is generic for maximally symmetric spaces. Maximally symmetric spaces can be considered as sub-manifolds of flat space, arising as surfaces of constant proper distance 

which have O(p, q) symmetry. If the submanifold has dimension , this group of symmetries has the expected dimension (as a Lie group).

Heuristically, we can derive the dimension of the Killing field algebra. In total this is  independent values of initial data.

For concrete examples, see below for examples of flat space (Minkowski space) and maximally symmetric spaces (sphere, hyperbolic space).

Killing fields on the hyperbolic plane

A toy example for a Killing vector field is on the upper half-plane  equipped with the Poincaré metric . The pair  is typically called the hyperbolic plane and has Killing vector field  (using standard coordinates). This should be intuitively clear since the covariant derivative  transports the metric along an integral curve generated by the vector field (whose image is parallel to the x-axis). 

The other two generating Killing fields are dilatation  and the special conformal transformation .

Killing fields on a 2-sphere

The Killing fields of the two-sphere , or more generally the -sphere  should be "obvious" from ordinary intuition: spheres, having rotational symmetry, should possess Killing fields which generate rotations about any axis. That is, we expect  to have symmetry under the action of the 3D rotation group SO(3).

This is articulated below. This "non-obvious" structure is generic to manifolds that are not spheres, and thus the 2-sphere provides a good toy model on which to explore the intuitive interpretation of Killing fields. 

so that  parametrises the height, and  parametrises rotation about the -axis.

Pulling back the standard Cartesian metric  to these coordinates gives the standard metric on the sphere,
.

Intuitively, a rotation about any axis should be an isometry. In this chart, we can immediately write down the vector field which generates rotations about the -axis:

Naïvely we might hope to find another Killing vector

In fact, explicitly evaluating Killing's equation reveals it is not a Killing field. Intuitively, the flow generated by  moves points downwards. Near , points move apart, thus distorting the metric, and we can see it is not an isometry, and therefore not a Killing field.

Killing fields have the property that the Lie bracket of two Killing fields is still a Killing field. Thus, the Killing fields on a manifold M form a Lie subalgebra of vector fields on M. For example, we may wish to compute the dimension of this algebra and its structure constants, and possibly identify the Lie algebra.

Since  are a coordinate basis, their commutator vanishes. Unfortunately, as earlier mentioned,  is not a Killing field. In these coordinates, it is difficult to guess other Killing fields.

The generator  is recognized as a rotation about the -axis

A second generator, rotations about the -axis, is

Commuting these two, one finds a third generator for rotations about the -axis

The algebra given by linear combinations of these three generators closes, and we have the relations 
 We identify this as the Lie algebra 

and

We'd like to say these three Killing fields are a complete set of generators for the algebra. This can be shown using Killing's equation. Translations do not preserve the unit sphere, but rotations do. Hence this is the complete set of generators of the algebra of Killing fields, which we can identify with  the algebra of rotations.

Killing fields in Minkowski space
The Killing fields of Minkowski space are the 3 space translations, time translation, three generators of rotations (the little group) and the three generators of boosts. These are

 Time and space translations

 Vector fields generating three rotations, often called the J generators,

 Vector fields generating three boosts, the K generators,

The boosts and rotations generate the Lorentz group. Together with space-time translations, this forms the Lie algebra for the Poincaré group.

Killing fields in general relativity
Killing fields are used to discuss isometries in general relativity (in which the geometry of spacetime as distorted by gravitational fields is viewed as a 4-dimensional pseudo-Riemannian manifold). In a static configuration, in which nothing changes with time, the time vector will be a Killing vector, and thus the Killing field will point in the direction of forward motion in time. The other three are the three generators of rotations discussed above. The Kerr metric for a rotating black hole has only two Killing fields: the time-like field, and a field generating rotations about the axis of rotation of the black hole.

de Sitter space and anti-de Sitter space are maximally symmetric spaces, with the -dimensional versions of each possessing  Killing fields.

Killing field of a constant coordinate
If the metric coefficients  in some coordinate basis  are independent of one of the coordinates , then  is a Killing vector, where  is the Kronecker delta.

To prove this, let us assume . Then  and 

Now let us look at the Killing condition

The Killing condition becomes

 The physical meaning is, for example, that, if none of the metric coefficients is a function of time, the manifold must automatically have a time-like Killing vector.
 In layman's terms, if an object doesn't transform or "evolve" in time (when time passes), time passing won't change the measures of the object. Formulated like this, the result sounds like a tautology, but one has to understand that the example is very much contrived: Killing fields apply also to much more complex and interesting cases.

In these coordinates, the Lie derivative reduces to the coordinate derivative, that is,

and by the definition of the Killing field the left-hand side vanishes.

Properties 
A Killing field is determined uniquely by a vector at some point and its gradient (i.e. all covariant derivatives of the field at the point).

The Lie bracket of two Killing fields is still a Killing field. The Killing fields on a manifold M thus form a Lie subalgebra of vector fields on M. This is the Lie algebra of the isometry group of the manifold if M is complete. A Riemannian manifold with a transitive group of isometries is a homogeneous space.

For compact manifolds
 Negative Ricci curvature implies there are no nontrivial (nonzero) Killing fields.
 Nonpositive Ricci curvature implies that any Killing field is parallel. i.e. covariant derivative along any vector field is identically zero.
 If the sectional curvature is positive and the dimension of M is even, a Killing field must have a zero.

The covariant divergence of every Killing vector field vanishes.

Geodesics 
Each Killing vector corresponds to a quantity which is conserved along geodesics. This conserved quantity is the metric product between the Killing vector and the geodesic tangent vector. Along an affinely parametrized geodesic with tangent vector  then given the Killing vector , the quantity  is conserved:

This aids in analytically studying motions in a spacetime with symmetries.

Stress-energy tensor 

Cartan decomposition 
As noted above, the Lie bracket of two Killing fields is still a Killing field. The Killing fields on a manifold  thus form a Lie subalgebra  of all vector fields on  Selecting a point  the algebra  can be decomposed into two parts:

and

where  is the covariant derivative. These two parts intersect trivially but do not in general split . For instance, if  is a Riemannian homogeneous space, we have  if and only if  is a Riemannian symmetric space.

Intuitively, the isometries of  locally define a submanifold  of the total space, and the Killing fields show how to "slide along" that submanifold. They span the tangent space of that submanifold. The tangent space  should have the same dimension as the isometries acting effectively at that point. That is, one expects  Yet, in general, the number of Killing fields is larger than the dimension of that tangent space. How can this be? The answer is that the "extra" Killing fields are redundant. Taken all together, the fields provide an over-complete basis for the tangent space at any particular selected point; linear combinations can be made to vanish at that particular point. This was seen in the example of the Killing fields on a 2-sphere: there are 3 Killing fields; at any given point, two span the tangent space at that point, and the third one is a linear combination of the other two. Picking any two defines  the remaining degenerate linear combinations define an orthogonal space

Cartan involution
The Cartan involution is defined as the mirroring or reversal of the direction of a geodesic. Its differential flips the direction of the tangents to a geodesic. It is a linear operator of norm one; it has two invariant subspaces, of eigenvalue +1 and −1.

This can be made more precise. Fixing a point  consider a geodesic  passing through , with  The involution  is defined as

This map is an involution, in that  When restricted to geodesics along the Killing fields, it is also clearly an isometry. It is uniquely defined.

Let  be the group of isometries generated by the Killing fields. The function  defined by

Its infinitesimal  is

The Cartan involution is a Lie algebra homomorphism, in that

for all   The subspace  has odd parity under the Cartan involution, while  has even parity.  That is, denoting the Cartan involution at point  as  one has

and

where  is the identity map.

As these are even and odd parity subspaces, the Lie brackets split, so that

and

The above decomposition holds at all points  for a symmetric space ; proofs can be found in Jost. They also hold in more general settings, but not necessarily at all points of the manifold.

For the special case of a symmetric space, one explicitly has that  that is, the Killing fields span the entire tangent space of a symmetric space. Equivalently, the curvature tensor is covariantly constant on locally symmetric spaces, and so these are locally parallelizable; this is the Cartan–Ambrose–Hicks theorem.

Generalizations 
 Killing tensor fields are symmetric tensor fields T such that the trace-free part of the symmetrization of  vanishes. Examples of manifolds with Killing tensors include the rotating black hole and the FRW cosmology.
 Killing vector fields can also be defined on any manifold M (possibly without a metric) if we take any Lie group G acting on it instead of the group of isometries. In this broader sense, a Killing vector field is the pushforward of a right invariant vector field on G by the group action. If the group action is effective, then the space of the Killing vector fields is isomorphic to the Lie algebra  of G.

See also
 Affine vector field
 Curvature collineation
 Homothetic vector field
 Killing form
 Killing horizon
 Killing spinor
 Matter collineation
 Spacetime symmetries

References

Riemannian geometry